The San Francisco Green Film Festival was an environmental film festival which was held annually from 2011 to 2019.

History 
The festival was founded by Rachel Caplan, who had previously worked for the Edinburgh Film Festival, the San Francisco Film Society and the San Francisco Ocean Film Festival. She created the festival to connect international environmental films and filmmakers with San Francisco Bay Area audiences and increase awareness of the climate crisis.

Over 9 years, the Festival grew from a 3-day programme in one small venue to a weeklong event in multiple venues across the city, and the largest environmental film festival in the USA outside the long-established Environmental Film Festival in the Nation's Capital in Washington D.C. The festival was known for its 'Take Action' programmes, encouraging audiences to get involved with local climate campaigns and causes in partnership with organisations such as Sierra Club, Greenpeace, and 350.org.

SFGFF was recognised Internationally through an official partnership with the United Nations Environment Programme (UNEP) to support the Sustainable Development Goals (SDGs); and membership of the Green Film Network, a global association of 30 film festivals which focus on environmental issues. Its Science on Screen and Impact Film Forum initiatives were funded by National Endowment for the Arts.

In nine years, the festival presented over 600 feature length and short films with over 800 guests  ranging from filmmakers to scientists, academics, activists, indigenous leaders and youth. Notable guests included Margaret Atwood, Annie Leonard, Fredrik Gertten, Louie Psihoyos, The Yes Men, Jonathan Franzen, Céline Cousteau, Yann Arthus-Bertrand, Josh Fox, Virginia McKenna, Ralph Eggleston, and Madonna Thunderhawk.

In 2018, the Festival was the official film presenting partner of the Global Climate Action Summit, hosted by the U.N.'s Christiana Figueres, Michael Bloomberg, and California Governor Jerry Brown.

In 2019, the Green Film Festival took place for the last time. The Opening Night event at the Castro Theare included a screening of Fredrik Gertten’s feature documentary film Push, and a conversation with U.N. Special Rapporteur on Adequate Housing, Leilani Farha.

The tenth edition was planned to be held over 10 days in September 2020, but in May it was announced that the festival would cease operations due to the COVID-19 pandemic.  Around that time, it had a staff of three employees, not counting its board of directors.

In 2022, SF IndieFest launched the 'Green Film Festival of San Francisco' as a new event which is not affiliated with this festival.

Venues 
Castro Theatre
Roxie Theater
San Francisco Public Library
518 Valencia
Ninth Street Independent Film Center

Awards

Best Feature Award
2019 - Push directed by Fredrik Gertten
2018 - Anote's Ark directed by Matthew Rytz
2017 – RISE: Standing Rock directed by Michelle Latimer
2016 – Catching the Sun directed by Shalini Kantayya
2015 – Bikes vs Cars directed by Fredrik Gertten
2014 – DamNation directed by Matt Stoeker, Travis Rummel and Ben Knight
2013 – More Than Honey directed by Markus Imhoof
2012 – You've Been Trumped directed by Anthony Baxter

Best Short Award
2019 - After the Fire directed by Derek Knowles & Spencer Seibert
2018 - Invisible Blanket directed by Pasha Reshikov
2017 – Pangolin directed by Katie Schuler & Nick Rogacki
2016 – Nature Rx directed by Justin Bogardus
2015 – Beyond Recognition directed by Michelle Grace Steinberg
2014 – Sticky directed by Jilli Rose
2013 – The Story of An Egg directed by Douglas Gayeton
2012 – Coalition of the Willing directed by Knife Party

Green Fire Award
Juried award introduced in 2017 for Best Bay Area Environmental Feature with $5,000 prize.
2019 - Artifishal directed by Josh "Bones" Murphy
2018 - Wilder Than Wild: Forests, Fires and the Future directed by Stephen Most & Kevin White
2017 – Tidewater directed by Roger Sorkin

Green Tenacity Award
2019 - Cooked: Survival by Zip Code directed by Judith Helfand
2018 - Stroop: Journey into the Rhino Horn War directed by Susan Scott (and Bonné de Bod)
2017 – Dead Donkeys Fear No Hyenas directed by Joakim Demmer
2016 – Not Without Us directed by Mark Decena
2015 – The Chinese Mayor directed by Zhou Hao
2014 – Come Hell or High Water: The Battle for Turkey Creek directed by Leah Mahan
2013 – Thomas Riedelsheimer (for body of work)
2012 – Blood in the Mobile directed by Frank Piasecki Poulsen
2011 – Bananas!* directed by Fredrik Gertten

Inspiring Lives Award
2019 - The Age of Stupid directed by Franny Armstrong
2018 - Food Coop directed by Tom Boothe
2017 – Flo Stone, founder of Environmental Film Festival in the Nation's Capital
2016 – Virginia McKenna, actress/activist of Born Free''''
2015 – Landfill Harmonic directed by Brad Allgood and Graham Townsley
2014 – Project Wild Thing directed by David Bond
2013 – Bidder 70 directed by Beth and George Gage
2012 – Urban Roots directed by Tree Media

Audience Award
2019 - Motherload directed by Liz Canning
2018 - Patrimonio directed by Lisa F. Jackson & Sarah Teale
2017 – Yasuni Man directed by Ryan Killackey
2016 – The Babushkas of Chernobyl directed by Holly Morris and Ann Bogart
2015 – Landfill Harmonic directed by Brad Allgood and Graham Townsley
2014 – Seeds of Time directed by Sandy McLeod
2013 – La Source directed by Patrick Shen
2012 – Sushi: The Global Catch directed by Mark Hall

Young Filmmaker Award
2019 - Save our Planet directed by Alexis Buggs Hodgson
2018 - Youth Unstoppable directed by Slater Jewell-Kemker
2017 – The Plastic Bottle Controversy - Explained directed by Jeffery Chen
2016 – Escape Velocity directed by James Tralie
2015 – Pseudo Evolution'' directed by Luisa Gobel and Bruna Almeida

Green Film Network 
The Festival was a member of the Green Film Network, an association of worldwide environmental film festivals.

References

External links

San Francisco Green Film Festival website [archive]

Film festivals in the San Francisco Bay Area
Environmental film festivals in the United States
Environmental organizations based in the San Francisco Bay Area
Non-profit organizations based in San Francisco